The 1968 United States presidential election in Iowa took place on November 5, 1968, as part of the 1968 United States presidential election. Iowa voters chose nine representatives, or electors, to the Electoral College, who voted for president and vice president.

Iowa was won by the Republican candidate, former Vice President Richard Nixon, with 53.01 percent of the popular vote, against the Democratic candidate, former Senator and incumbent Vice President Hubert Humphrey, with 40.82 percent. American Independent Party candidate George Wallace performed decently, finishing with 5.69 percent of the popular vote.

Nixon's victory was the first of five consecutive Republican victories in the state, as Iowa would not vote for a Democratic candidate again until Michael Dukakis in 1988. Since then it has become a heavily competitive swing state, which leaned Democrat for three decades, voting for the Democratic presidential candidate every year from 1992-2012, except for when George W. Bush narrowly won the state over John Kerry in 2004, but now leans Republican.

Results

Results by county

See also
 United States presidential elections in Iowa

Notes

References

Iowa
1968
1968 Iowa elections